Spermophora is a genus of cellar spiders that was first described by Nicholas Marcellus Hentz in 1841.

Species
 it contains 45 species, found in Africa, Europe, Oceania, Asia, the United States, and Brazil:
Spermophora abibae Huber, 2014 – Congo
Spermophora akwamu Huber & Kwapong, 2013 – Ghana, Gabon
Spermophora awalai Huber, 2014 – Cameroon
Spermophora berlandi Fage, 1936 – Kenya
Spermophora bukusu Huber & Warui, 2012 – Kenya, Uganda
Spermophora deelemanae Huber, 2005 – Indonesia (Ambon)
Spermophora dieke Huber, 2009 – Guinea
Spermophora dumoga Huber, 2005 – Indonesia (Sulawesi)
Spermophora estebani Simon, 1892 – Philippines
Spermophora falcata Yao & Li, 2013 – Laos
Spermophora gordimerae Huber, 2003 – South Africa
Spermophora jocquei Huber, 2003 – Comoros, Mayotte
Spermophora kaindi Huber, 2005 – New Guinea
Spermophora kerinci Huber, 2005 – Indonesia (Sumatra, Bali). Introduced to Germany
Spermophora kirinyaga Huber & Warui, 2012 – Kenya
Spermophora kivu Huber, 2003 – Congo
Spermophora kyambura Huber & Warui, 2012 – Cameroon to Uganda
Spermophora lambilloni Huber, 2003 – Comoros
Spermophora luzonica Huber, 2005 – Philippines
Spermophora maathaiae Huber & Warui, 2012 – Kenya
Spermophora maculata Keyserling, 1891 – Brazil
Spermophora maros Huber, 2005 – Indonesia (Sulawesi)
Spermophora masisiwe Huber, 2003 – Tanzania
Spermophora mau Huber & Warui, 2012 – Kenya
Spermophora minotaura Berland, 1920 – East Africa
Spermophora morogoro Huber, 2003 – Tanzania
Spermophora palau Huber, 2005 – Caroline Is.
Spermophora paluma Huber, 2001 – Australia (Queensland)
Spermophora pembai Huber, 2003 – South Africa
Spermophora peninsulae Lawrence, 1964 – South Africa
Spermophora persica Senglet, 2008 – Iran
Spermophora ranomafana Huber, 2003 – Madagascar
Spermophora sangarawe Huber, 2003 – Tanzania
Spermophora schoemanae Huber, 2003 – South Africa
Spermophora senoculata (Dugès, 1836) (type) – Middle East. Introduced to USA, southern Europe, China, Korea, Japan
Spermophora senoculatoides Senglet, 2008 – Iran
Spermophora sumbawa Huber, 2005 – Indonesia (Sunda Is.)
Spermophora suurbraak Huber, 2003 – South Africa
Spermophora thorelli Roewer, 1942 – Myanmar
Spermophora tonkoui Huber, 2003 – Guinea, Ivory Coast
Spermophora tumbang Huber, 2005 – Borneo
Spermophora usambara Huber, 2003 – Tanzania
Spermophora vyvato Huber, 2003 – Madagascar
Spermophora yao Huber, 2001 – Australia (Queensland)
Spermophora ziama Huber & Kwapong, 2013 – Guinea

See also
 List of Pholcidae species

References

Araneomorphae genera
Pholcidae
Spiders of Africa
Spiders of Asia
Spiders of Australia
Spiders of South America